The 1967 New Brunswick general election was held on October 23, 1967, to elect 58 members to the 46th New Brunswick Legislative Assembly, the governing house of the province of New Brunswick, Canada.

Description 
The governing Liberal Party, under Premier Louis Robichaud, had just completed implementing its landmark Equal Opportunity program, which drastically improved government services in poorer and francophone regions of the province. Several Liberal cabinet ministers had quit politics during the previous term, including some who were uncomfortable with Robichaud's policies. Education minister Henry Irwin was fired after having an extramarital affair.

The Progressive Conservatives had selected Charlie Van Horne as leader in November 1966. Van Horne, whose cowboy hat had become his trademark to voters, had faced several lawsuits over his personal financial matters during the 1960s which caused him to sell his hotel in Campbellton, but claimed they had all been settled. Liberals claimed that industrialist K.C. Irving, who was in his own personal battle with Robichaud, was funding Van Horne's campaign. Conservatives were hopeful that Van Horne's charisma and speaking skills could surpass those of Robichaud.

During the campaign, critics accused Van Horne of being vague on his promises for "a new tomorrow". He had pledged to increase health care and education funding while reducing taxes, with no answer as to how it would be accomplished.

Questions arose as to the Conservative campaign's funding. He campaigned across the province in a Cadillac, while Don Messer, one of the most popular musicians in Atlantic Canada at the time, accompanied Van Horne at several campaign stops. However, Equal Opportunity was wildly unpopular in many Conservative strongholds and the Liberals had been perceived as arrogant. Polls showed a close race.

Robichaud campaigned under the slogan of "a responsible government". With the entire campaign focused on attacking Van Horne, he used a dramatic effect of listing all of the Conservatives' promises on paper and unfurling it across a room. In the final days of the campaign, two Toronto newspapers ran unflattering articles about Van Horne, to which he threatened to sue the authors. The Conservative reaction is believed to have turned the results decidedly in Robichaud's favour.

The New Brunswick New Democratic Party participated in a New Brunswick provincial election for the first time, having sat out of the 1963 election. The party ran only three candidates, all of whom contested the multi-member district of Northumberland and none of whom were elected.

Election results

Sources
Louis J. Robichaud: A Not So Quiet Revolution by Michel Cormier, translated by Jonathan Kaplansky. Faye Editions, 2004.

References

Further reading
 

Elections in New Brunswick
1967 elections in Canada
1967 in New Brunswick
October 1967 events in Canada